The 2017 Wheelchair Tennis Masters (also known as the 2017 NEC Wheelchair Tennis Masters for sponsorship reasons) is a wheelchair tennis tournament played at the Loughborough University Tennis Centre in Loughborough, United Kingdom, from 29 November to 3 December 2017. It is the season-ending event for the highest-ranked wheelchair tennis singles players on the 2017 ITF Wheelchair Tennis Tour.

Tournament
The 2017 NEC Wheelchair Tennis Masters took place from 29 November to 3 December at the Loughborough University Tennis Centre in Loughborough, United Kingdom. It was the 24th edition of the tournament (14th for quad players). The tournament is run by the International Tennis Federation (ITF) and is part of the 2017 ITF Wheelchair Tennis Tour. The event takes place on indoor hard courts. It serves as the season-ending championships for singles players on the ITF Wheelchair Tennis Tour.
The eight players who qualify for the men's and women's events, and six players who qualify for the quad event, are split into two groups of three or four. During this stage, players compete in a round-robin format (meaning players play against all the other players in their group).
The two players with the best results in each group progress to the semifinals, where the winners of a group face the runners-up of the other group. This stage, however, is a knock-out stage.

Format
The Wheelchair Tennis Masters has a round-robin format, with six/eight players divided into two groups of three/four. The six/eight seeds are determined by the UNIQLO Wheelchair Tennis Rankings as they stood on 16 October 2017. All matches are the best of three tie-break sets, including the final.

Qualified players
The following players qualified for the 2017 Wheelchair Tennis Masters, based upon rankings as at 16 October 2017. Players whose names are struck out qualified but did not participate and were replaced by the next highest ranking player.

Men's Singles

Women's Singles

Quad Singles

Head-to-head
2017 Wheelchair Tennis Masters – Men's singles

2017 Wheelchair Tennis Masters – Women's singles

2017 Wheelchair Tennis Masters – Quad singles

Champions

Men's singles

 Alfie Hewett def.  Gordon Reid, 6–3, 6–2

Women's singles

 Diede de Groot def.  Yui Kamiji, 7–5, 6–4

Quad singles

 David Wagner def.  Andrew Lapthorne, 6–1, 6–2

See also
ITF Wheelchair Tennis Tour
2017 Wheelchair Doubles Masters

References

External links
 
 ITF tournament profile

Masters, 2017